is a song by Japanese actress and recording artist Takako Matsu, released as the second single from her second album, Ai no Tobira (1998). Released on March 25, 1998, through Arista Japan, the song's lyrics were penned by Matsu and production handled by Satoshi Takebe. The single peaked at number 9 on the Oricon singles chart.

Track listing

Charts

References

1998 songs
1998 singles
Japanese-language songs
Takako Matsu songs
Arista Records singles